Krupen Ridge (‘Krupenski Hrebet’ \'kru-pen-ski 'hre-bet\) is the rocky ridge extending 15.2 km in east-west direction, 4.6 km wide, and rising to 1105 m in its western part, situsted in eastern Aristotle Mountains on Oscar II Coast in Graham Land.  It surmounts Pequod Glacier to the north and Rachel Glacier to the south.  The feature is named after the settlement of Krupen in Northeastern Bulgaria.

Location
British mapping in 1976.

Maps
 British Antarctic Territory.  Scale 1:200000 topographic map.  DOS 610 Series, Sheet W 65 62.  Directorate of Overseas Surveys, Tolworth, UK, 1976.
 Antarctic Digital Database (ADD). Scale 1:250000 topographic map of Antarctica. Scientific Committee on Antarctic Research (SCAR). Since 1993, regularly upgraded and updated.

Notes

References
 Krupen Ridge. SCAR Composite Antarctic Gazetteer.
 Bulgarian Antarctic Gazetteer. Antarctic Place-names Commission. (details in Bulgarian, basic data in English)

External links
 Krupen Ridge. Copernix satellite image

Ridges of Graham Land
Oscar II Coast
Bulgaria and the Antarctic